Sergio Piller (born 21 November 1969) is a retired Italian cross-country skier.

He made his World Cup debut in December 1992 in Kavgolovo, and broke the top 30-barrier with a 21st place in December 1995 in Brusson. He broke the top 20 for the first time in March 1996 in Lahti, and recorded his highest placement with 11th in March 1998 in Falun. His last World Cup outing came in December 2000 in Brusson.

Cross-country skiing results
All results are sourced from the International Ski Federation (FIS).

World Cup

Season standings

Team podiums

 1 podium – (1 )

References

External links
 

1969 births
Living people
Italian male cross-country skiers